The Edremit gulf    is an Aegean gulf in Turkey's Balıkesir Province. Biga Peninsula is to the north. The southern coast belongs to the  ilçe of Ayvalık, while the western entrance is enclosed with the northern part of the Greek island of Lesbos.

In ancient history there were many settlements lying close to the north coast of the gulf; Hamaxitus, Polymedium, Assos, Lamponeia, Antandrus and  Adramyttion, were some of these.

Currently there are a number of ilçe centers or bigger towns around the gulf such as Behramkale, Küçükkuyu, Altınoluk, Akçay,  Havran, Burhaniye , Armutova, Ayvalık and Cunda Island (from the north west).

The gulf is famous for European sprat production.

References

External links
Coast guide

Balıkesir Province
Gulfs of Turkey
Edremit